Raf is a Canadian dark comedy film, directed by Harry Cepka and released in 2019. The film stars Grace Glowicki as Raf, an aimless young woman in Vancouver, British Columbia whose life is changed when she befriends Tal (Jesse Stanley), a richer and more motivated woman with questionable motives.

The film premiered at the 2019 Toronto International Film Festival.

The film received a nomination at the Vancouver Film Critics Circle Awards 2019, for Best British Columbia Film.

References

External links

2019 films
Canadian black comedy films
English-language Canadian films
Films shot in Vancouver
Films set in Vancouver
2019 black comedy films
2010s English-language films
2010s Canadian films